Garry Tan (born 1981) is the founder of Initialized Capital. He previously co-founded Posterous and Posthaven. He was also an early employee at Palantir Technologies, and a partner at Y Combinator.

Early life and education

Tan was born in 1981. Tan's parents were Singaporean immigrants. Tan grew up in Fremont, California and graduated from American High School. He started programming at 14-years-old and found his first job by cold-calling the Yellow Pages.

He attended Stanford University from 1999 to 2003, and graduated with a bachelor's degree in Computer Systems Engineering.

Career
Tan worked at Microsoft and then became the 10th employee at Palantir Technologies. In 2008, Tan co-founded Posterous, a blogging platform, which was acquired by Twitter in 2012 for $20 million. He co-founded Posthaven after the shutdown of Posterous. He joined Y Combinator in 2011 as a designer in residence and partner. At Y Combinator, Tan helped compile a directory of "the best and the brightest interaction designers and visual designers" and wrote Coinbase’s first seed round check in 2012.  While at Y Combinator, Tan and fellow Y Combinator partners raised $7 million in venture capital funding to support Y Combinator alumni companies, including Instacart and Coinbase. 

In 2012, Tan founded Initialized Capital, a venture capital fund.

In 2012, Tan raised $7 million for Initialized Capital’s first funding round. In 2013, Tan, Harjeet Taggar, and Alexis Ohanian raised $39 million for Initialized Capital. In 2016, Initialized Capital raised a $115 million third fund. The latest fund was closed in December 2021 for $700 million.

As of 2021, Tan remains an active investor in Initialized Capital. Tan invested in Instacart, Coinbase, and Flexport. 

Tan has been listed on the Forbes Midas List from 2018–2022.

Tan is president of Y Combinator as of January 2023, replacing Geoff Ralston.

Politics 
Tan donated to YIMBY groups such as the San Francisco Bay Area Renters' Federation, YIMBY Action, and YIMBY Law. In 2020, Tan said in an interview that he followed San Francisco housing news, and supported housing of all kinds, including market-rate housing, affordable housing, and homeless shelters. 

Tan donated at least $54,500 to GrowSF, a San Francisco pro-growth political group.

In 2021-2022, Tan gave at least $188,451 to local political causes.

In 2021-2022, Tan promoted and raised funds for the recall of members of the San Francisco School Board. Tan himself donated $20,000 to the campaign, and fundraised from friends like Cyan Banister. He promoted the recall and raised money from his Twitter following.

Tan supported the recall campaign of San Francisco District Attorney Chesa Boudin. Tan donated at least $100,000 to the effort. Tan blamed Boudin for physical attacks on Asians. Tan alleged that Boudin failed to hold violent criminal offenders accountable and failed to protect the general public, particularly the least advantaged. After the recall campaign succeeded, Tan supported the next District Attorney, Brooke Jenkins, and moderate politician Matt Dorsey.

Personal 
As of 2022, Tan lives in Noe Valley, San Francisco.

See also

 Alexis Ohanian
 Initialized Capital

References

External links
Inc.com articles

Stanford University alumni
21st-century American businesspeople
Living people
1981 births
Venture capitalists
Y Combinator people
American technology company founders